Owenites is a genus of a ceratite ammonoid that lived during the Early Triassic.

References 

Xenodiscoidea
Ceratitida genera